Coleophora loti is a moth of the family Coleophoridae. It is found in the Canary Islands.

The larvae feed on Lotus sessilifolius. Larvae can be found from February to April.

References

loti
Moths described in 1978
Moths of Africa